The CCITT Chinese Primary Set is a multi-byte graphic character set for Chinese communications created for the Consultative Committee on International Telephone and Telegraph (CCITT) in 1992. It is defined in ITU T.101, annex C, which codifies Data Syntax 2 Videotex. It is registered with the ISO-IR registry for use with ISO/IEC 2022 as ISO-IR-165, and encodable in the ISO-2022-CN-EXT code version.

It is an extended modification of GB/T 2312-80, and corresponds to the union of the Mainland Chinese GB standards GB 6345.1-86 and GB 8565.2-88, with some further modification and extensions. A subset of the GB 6345.1 extensions are incorporated into GB 18030, while GB 8565.2 serves as the Mainland Chinese source reference for certain CJK Unified Ideographs.

GB 6345.1
GB 6345.1-86 (32 × 32 Dot Matrix Font Set of Chinese Ideographs for Information Interchange) includes both a corrigendum and an extension for GB 2312. The corrigendum alters the following two characters: 

Deployed implementations incorporating GB 2312, such as Windows code page 936, generally follow these corrections in mapping 79-81 to U+953A.

The extension adds half-width ISO 646-CN characters in row 10 (in addition to the existing full-width characters in row 3) and extends the set of 26 non-ASCII pinyin characters in row 8 with six additional such characters. These GB 6345.1 extensions are also incorporated into GB/T 12345, the Traditional Chinese counterpart to GB 2312, in addition to 29 vertical presentation forms in row 6.

Later GB/T 6345.1-2010 published in 2011 officially adds half-width forms of the 32 pinyin characters (including the six new additions) in row 8 to row 11. This addition is not featured in GB 18030.

The six additional pinyin characters from GB 6345.1 and the vertical presentation forms from GB 12345 — but not the half-width forms — are included in the classic Mac OS encoding for Simplified Chinese (a modification of EUC-CN), and also as two-byte codes in GB 18030. The additional pinyin characters are as follows:

These extensions and modifications to GB 2312 were first introduced in GB 5007.1-85 in 1985.

GB 8565.2
GB 8565.2-88 (Information Processing - Coded Character Sets for Text Communication - Part 2: Graphic Characters) defines an extension for GB 2312, adding 705 characters between rows 13–15 and 90–94, of which 69 (all in row 15) are non-hanzi. It includes the GB 2312 corrections from GB 6345.1, but not its extensions.

The Unihan database references GB 8565.2 as the Mainland Chinese source of several hanzi included in Unicode.

CCITT changes
ISO-IR-165 incorporates the GB 2312 extensions from both GB 6345.1-86 and GB 8565.2-88. Additionally, it adds 161 further characters (including 139 hanzi, identified as “general Chinese characters and variants”). These CCITT hanzi extensions have on occasion been mistaken for standard GB 8565.2 characters, including in previous revisions of the Unihan database. In total the set contains 8446 characters.

A number of patterned semigraphic characters are included in row 6. This collides with the vertical presentation forms included in other extensions such as Mac OS Simplified Chinese and GB 18030.

The GB 6345.1 corrections to GB 2312 are applied, but two Unicode mappings are reversed compared to other encodings which include GB 2312 with GB 6345.1 extensions. The table below shows the mappings and their corresponding glyphs including GB 18030:

References

External links
ISO-IR-165: Code of the Chinese graphic character set for communication (registered 1992, amended 1994)
Unicode mappings for ISO-IR-165

Chinese-language computing
Character sets